Nicholas James Nardacci (May 24, 1901 – August 28, 1961) was an American football halfback and quarterback.  Nardacci was born in Youngstown, Ohio and graduated from Rayen High School in Youngstown.  He played college football for the West Virginia University teams that compiled a record of 25–2–2 in Nardacci's three years as a starter from 1922 to 1924.  He played on the 1922 team that played in the school's first post-season game and is the only undefeated football team in West Virginia history.  Nardacci rushed for 120 yards and one touchdown in the East-West Bowl, played in San Diego on Christmas Day 1922, and also threw a touchdown pass, to lead West Virginia to a win over Gonzaga.  Nardacci played an important part in West Virginia's rivalry games against Pitt and Washington & Jefferson.  He was selected as an All-American after the 1922 season.  Nardacci played one year of professional football for the Cleveland Bulldogs in the National Football League.

See also
1922 College Football All-America Team

References

1901 births
1961 deaths
West Virginia Mountaineers football players
Cleveland Bulldogs players